Duopalatinus is a small genus of long-whiskered catfishes native to South America.

Species
There are currently two recognized species in this genus:
 Duopalatinus emarginatus (Valenciennes, 1840)
 Duopalatinus peruanus Eigenmann & Allen, 1942

Duopalatinus is classified under the "Calophysus-Pimelodus clade". Within this clade, it is considered a part of the "Pimelodus-group" of Pimelodids, which also includes Pimelodus, Exallodontus, Cheirocerus, Iheringichthys, Bergiaria, Bagropsis, Parapimelodus, Platysilurus, Platystomatichthys, and Propimelodus.

Duopalatinus species are distributed in South America. D. emarginatus inhabits the São Francisco River basin. D. peruanus is found in the Amazon and Orinoco River basins.

Duopalatinus species grow to about 14–15 centimetres (5.5–5.9 in) SL.

References

Pimelodidae
Fish of South America
Fish of the Amazon basin
Catfish genera
Taxa named by Carl H. Eigenmann
Taxa named by Rosa Smith Eigenmann
Freshwater fish genera